Ricardo Jorge Mestre Correia (born 11 September 1983) is a Portuguese professional road bicycle racer, who last rode for UCI Continental team .

On 4 October 2022, he received a three-year ban by UCI for doping.

Major results

2006
 Volta a Portugal
1st Mountains classification
1st Young rider classification
1st Stage 6
2010
 1st  Overall GP do Minho
 2nd Overall Tour of Bulgaria
1st Stage 6
 8th Overall Volta a Portugal
2011
 1st  Overall Troféu Joaquim Agostinho
1st Stage 1
 1st  Overall Volta a Portugal
1st Stage 7
 7th Overall Tour of Bulgaria
2012
 1st  Overall Troféu Joaquim Agostinho
1st Stage 3
2017
 6th Overall Vuelta a Asturias
2018
 3rd Overall Vuelta a Asturias
1st Stage 3
 10th Overall Vuelta Ciclista Comunidad de Madrid
2019
 2nd Road race, National Road Championships

See also
 Doping in sport
 List of doping cases in cycling

References

External links

1983 births
Living people
Portuguese male cyclists
Volta a Portugal winners
People from Faro, Portugal
Sportspeople from Faro District
Doping cases in cycling